MasterChef Pinoy Edition is the Philippine version of the British reality competitive cooking series, MasterChef. The show first aired on ABS-CBN last November 12, 2012. The show is hosted by Judy Ann Santos-Agoncillo. Santos-Agoncillo is also joined by Chefs Fernando Aracama, Rolando Laudico and JP Anglo as the judges of the show.

Overview
The series is part of the MasterChef franchise and is based on a similar competition format in the United Kingdom entitled MasterChef.

Format
Of all the amateur chefs who audition nationwide, the chosen auditionees, usually three to four auditionees per episode, need to cook their signature dish under a 60-minute time limit for the four judges. Each judge takes a taste of the dish and gives his opinion before all of them deliberate and choose the auditionee will move on to the next round. After the initial round, all the auditionees will undergo more further cooking tests until the four judges have chosen the top finalists.

Each week, the finalists will undergo numerous challenges and tests. The finalists will also undergo elimination tests reducing their numbers until the only remaining hopeful cook remains.

Broadcasting
Unlike its international counterparts, the show is broadcast as a weekday morning program airing 45 minutes per episode in 5 times a week, Monday through Friday, while on Saturday edition which includes encore episodes with never before seen footage during the taping where they discover and whip up extraordinary dishes as well as give out cooking tips and trivia.

Prizes
The winner of the competition will receive the million peso cash prize, a culinary scholarship from the Center of Asian Culinary Studies, and a kitchen showcase from Fujidenzo.

Season summary

Season 1: 2012-2013

Contestants

Season 2: 2014

Contestants

See also
 List of programs broadcast by ABS-CBN
 MasterChef
 Junior MasterChef

References

External links
 MasterChef Pinoy Edition Official website
 MasterChef Pinoy Edition on Facebook
 MasterChef Pinoy Edition on Twitter

Philippine reality television series
Pinoy Edition
ABS-CBN original programming
2012 Philippine television series debuts
2013 Philippine television series endings
Philippine television series based on British television series
Filipino-language television shows